Konstanty Aleksander Jeleński (2 January 1922 - 4 May 1987) was a Polish essayist.

Biography
Konstanty Aleksander Jeleński (in French: Constantin Jelenski) was born on 2 January 1922 in Warsaw, Poland. He died on 4 May 1987 in Paris, France. At the age of eighteen he left Poland to serve the Polish Army in France. He lived the remainder of his life as an émigré, first in Italy for several years after the Second World War, then settling in Paris in 1951.

In Paris, Jeleński was active in Polish émigré literary circles. He led the Eastern European division of the Congress for Cultural Freedom (after 1967, the International Association for Cultural Freedom) and was a prolific contributor to the Association's monthly publication Preuves and to Kultura, the Polish émigré literary journal. Beginning in 1975, he became increasingly active with the Institut national de l'audiovisuel.

Jeleński's criticism, translations and edited works addresses a wide range of literary, political and artistic topics, especially twentieth-century Polish literature and history. Among his most influential works are many critical essays about Witold Gombrowicz and the edited volume Anthologie de la poesie polonaise (1965).

Since 1952, Jeleński was remaining in a relationship with Argentine painter Leonor Fini. Until his death they lived together and with Fini's former partner Italian painter Stanislao Lepri in Paris. Alleged biological father of Jeleński was Carlo Sforza.

References

Milosz, Czeslaw. The History of Polish Literature. Berkeley: University of California Press, 1983.

External links
 A guide to the Konstanty Jelenski Papers at the Beinecke Rare Book and Manuscript Library

1922 births
1987 deaths
Polish male writers
Polish LGBT writers
Polish expatriates in Italy
Polish expatriates in France
20th-century Polish LGBT people
People associated with the magazine "Kultura"